Vania Fitryanti Herlambang (born February 11, 1997) is an television presenter, project engineer, and fashion model who won the title of Puteri Indonesia Lingkungan 2018. She represented Indonesia at the Miss International 2018 pageant in Japan, where she placed as the Top 15 semi-finalist, continuing the ongoing 3rd year placement streaks of Indonesia, consecutively since Felicia Hwang Yi Xin in 2016 and Kevin Lilliana Junaedy in 2017.

Early life and education

Vania was born in Tangerang, Banten – Indonesia to a traditional Javanese parents. She started her foray into fashion modelling work since she was 12, by joining Jakarta Fashion Week teenage-model search. She holds a bachelor degree in Chemical Engineering from Bandung Institute of Technology, Bandung, West Java, Indonesia.

During her reign as Puteri Indonesia Lingkungan, she popularly known for her recycling campaign during 2019 Indonesian general election to propose the Election Committee to recycle campaign props. On 2018, She appears on the Top 50 Essay list on "Woman Technology Essay Competition" by Schlumberger and Young Leaders for Indonesia Regional Wave 4. Since May 2018, Vania was elected as The Head of Communication of The Ministry of Women Empowerment and Child Protection of the Republic of Indonesia by the minister Yohana Yembise.

Pageantry

Puteri Banten 2018
In 2018, Vania competed in the regional pageant of Puteri Banten 2018, and won the title to represent her province Banten in Puteri Indonesia 2018. She was crowned by the outgoing titleholder Ratu Vashti Annisa.

Puteri Indonesia 2018

Vania was crowned as Puteri Indonesia Lingkungan 2018 at the grand finale held in Jakarta Convention Center, Jakarta, Indonesia on March 9, by the outgoing titleholder of Puteri Indonesia Lingkungan 2017 and Miss International 2017, Kevin Lilliana Junaedy of West Java. Vania represented the Banten province at the pageant.

The finale coronation night of Puteri Indonesia 2018 was attended by the reigning Miss Universe 2017 – Demi-Leigh Nel-Peters of South Africa, Miss International 2017 – Kevin Lilliana Junaedy of Indonesia, and Miss Supranational 2017 – Jenny Kim of South Korea,  as a main Guest-star. Vania was crowned together with her two bestfriends, Sonia Fergina Citra as Puteri Indonesia 2018. and Wilda Octaviana Situngkir as Puteri Indonesia Pariwisata 2018. and  They're appear on the magazine cover of Tatler Indonesia together with Mooryati Soedibyo and Putri Kuswisnuwardhani.

Miss International 2018
As Puteri Indonesia Lingkungan 2018, Vania represented Indonesia at the 58th edition of Miss International 2018 pageant in held in Tokyo Dome City Hall, Bunkyo, Tokyo, Japan. The finale was held on November 9, 2018, where she placed as one of the Top 15 finalists, she also won "Miss Panasonic Beauty" from Panasonic sponsor. Kevin Lilliana Junaedy of Indonesia crowned her successor Mariem Claret Velazco García of Venezuela by the end of the event.

See also

 Puteri Indonesia 2018
 Miss International 2018
 Sonia Fergina Citra
 Wilda Octaviana Situngkir

References

External links
Puteri Indonesia Official Website
Miss International Official Website
Vania Fitryanti Official Instagram

Living people
1997 births
Puteri Indonesia winners
Miss International 2018 delegates
Mental health activists
Indonesian beauty pageant winners
Indonesian female models
Indonesian Muslims
Bandung Institute of Technology alumni
Javanese people
People from Tangerang
People from Banten
People of Javanese descent